Oncideres bondari is a species of beetle in the family Cerambycidae. It was described by Melzer in 1923. It is known from Brazil.

References

bondari
Beetles described in 1923